Jacob Andrew Wakeling (born 15 September 2001) is an English professional footballer who plays for Swindon Town, as a striker.

Career
Wakeling began his career with West Bromwich Albion, being released by them in 2020. After playing in non-league football for Alvechurch, Wakeling signed for Leicester City in November 2020, before moving on loan to Barrow in January 2022. Wakeling played four times for Barrow before returning to Leicester, from where he was released as a player in June 2022.

In July 2022 he signed for Swindon Town after previously being on trial at the club. After scoring 4 goals and making 3 assists in his first 10 league games, on 30 September 2022, Wakeling signed a contract extension keeping him at Swindon Town until 2026.

References

2001 births
Living people
English footballers
Association football forwards
West Bromwich Albion F.C. players
Alvechurch F.C. players
Leicester City F.C. players
Barrow A.F.C. players
Swindon Town F.C. players
Southern Football League players
English Football League players